Irai Ningthou or Ike Ningthau is a God in Meitei mythology and religion (Sanamahism) of Ancient Kangleipak (early Manipur). He is the God and the divine male personification of water. He mainly dwells in the rivers and lakes.

He is the consort of Irai Leima (alias Ireima). The divine couples are regarded as the spirits of the water bodies.

Name 
The name "Irai Ningthou" literally means "King of water" or "Chief of water".

Worship 
When a person gets ill after bathing in a water body, people believed that the water spirits (Irai Ningthou and his wife Irai Leima) had caught the person. To get well again, people worship the two deities. For this, the maibas perform the rites and rituals. The offerings include 2 eggs and 7 bamboo vessels filled up with rice paste.

The Thadou people also highly honour the water deities. They offer wild sacrifices like white fowl, pig, dog or he-goat to the God.

See also 

 Irai Leima

References

External links 

 Irai Ningthou_archive.org
 Irai Ningthou (Ike Ningthau)_English Wikisource
Water deities
Meitei deities
Kings in Meitei mythology
Articles containing Old Manipuri-language text
Pages with unreviewed translations